is a common masculine Japanese given name.

Possible writings

Daisuke can be written using different kanji characters and can mean:
大輔, "big, assist"
大介, "big, mediate"
大祐, "big, bless"
大助, "big, help"
大典, "big, law/rule/ceremony"
The name can also be written in hiragana or katakana.

Manga artists
Daisuke Higuchi (樋口 大輔), a Japanese female manga artist best known for her work on Whistle!
Daisuke Igarashi (五十嵐大介), a Japanese manga artist known for his bold, detailed art style and innovative storytelling
Daisuke Moriyama (森山大輔), a Japanese manga artist best known for creating the Chrono Crusade series

Sportspeople
, Japanese long jumper
, Japanese Paralympic swimmer
, Japanese water polo player
Daisuke Ikeshima (池島 大介), retired Japanese race walker
, Japanese golfer
, Japanese Paralympic swimmer
Daisuke Matsuzaka (松坂 大輔), Japanese professional baseball player who pitches for the Fukuoka SoftBank Hawks
Daisuke Murakami (snowboarder), (村上 大輔), Japanese snowboarder who competed in the 2002 Winter Olympics
Daisuke Naito (内藤 大助), retired Japanese professional boxer
Daisuke Nakata (中田大輔), Japanese trampolinist who competed in the 2000 Summer Olympics
, Japanese ice hockey player
Daisuke Ohata, (大畑大介), Japanese rugby player
Daisuke Usami, (宇佐美 大輔), Japanese volleyball player

Football players
Daisuke Ichikawa (市川 大祐), Japanese football player who plays as a defender and midfielder for the Fujieda MYFC team
, Japanese football player
, Japanese footballer
, Japanese footballer
Daisuke Matsui (松井 大輔), Japanese footballer who plays for Lechia Gdańsk of Ekstraklasa in Poland
, Japanese footballer and manager
Daisuke Nasu (那須 大亮), Japanese football player who plays for the Urawa Red Diamonds
, Japanese footballer
Daisuke Oku, Japanese former football player 
Daisuke Sakata, (坂田 大輔), Japanese football (soccer) player who plays for Avispa Fukuoka in the J. League
, Japanese footballer
, Japanese footballer

Skaters
Daisuke Murakami (figure skater) (村上 大介), Japanese figure skater
, Japanese figure skater

Wrestlers
Daisuke Harada (原田 大輔), professional wrestler signed to Pro Wrestling Noah
Daisuke Ikeda (池田大輔), professional wrestler competing in the Independent circuit in Japan
Daisuke Sasaki (佐々木 大輔), professional wrestler
Daisuke Sekimoto (関本 大介), professional wrestler
Daisuke Tochiazuma, retired sumo wrestler

Actors & voice actors
Daisuke Gōri (郷里 大輔, 1952–2010), Japanese voice actor, actor and narrator
Daisuke Hirakawa (平川 大輔, born 1973), Japanese voice actor
Daisuke Kishio (岸尾 だいすけ), Japanese voice actor
Daisuke Matsubara (松原 大典), Japanese voice actor
Daisuke Nakamura (actor) (中村 太亮), Japanese voice actor
Daisuke Namikawa (浪川 大輔, born 1976), Japanese voice actor
Daisuke Ono (小野 大輔, born 1978), Japanese voice actor well known for voicing Sebastian Michaelis in the anime adaption of Black Butler
Daisuke Sakaguchi (阪口 大助, born 1973), Japanese voice actor affiliated with Aoni Production
, Japanese-American actor and voice actor

Other
, Japanese independent game developer
, Japanese pop artist, songwriter and producer 
, Japanese actor
, Japanese businessman and former livedoor executive 
, Japanese businessman who invented Karaoke
, Japanese singer, composer and multi-instrumentist 
, Japanese video game developer and musician
, Japanese shogi player
, Japanese actor
, Japanese basketball player
, Japanese politician
, Japanese comedian and actor
, Japanese professional Go player
, Japanese shogi player
, Japanese actor (Kamen Rider Zero-One)
, Japanese mixed martial artist
, Japanese student who tried to assassinate Hirohito in 1923
, Japanese actor
, Japanese shogi player
Daisuke Takahashi (mathematician), Japanese mathematician
, vocalist of the Japanese band Maximum the Hormone
, Japanese IT, music journalist, and writer
, Japanese male model
, Japanese video game scenario writer
, Japanese stage/screen/TV actor
, Japanese photographer
, Japanese singer and actor

Fictional characters
, in the manga Kodomo no Jikan
, from the manga Ghost in the Shell
, from Heat Guy J.
, from the anime Rockman.exe NT Warrior
, from Lupin III manga
, from Kamen Rider Kabuto
 (Davis Motomiya in English dub), from Digimon
, of manga and anime series, D.N.Angel
Daisuke Serizawa, eyepatch-wearing character in Godzilla
Daisuke, from the film Urduja
Daisuke, from the film The Grudge 3
, from the anime/manga series, UFO Robot Grendizer
, from anime/manga series, The Millionaire Detective Balance: Unlimited
Daisuke Ido (イド ダイスケ), from the manga Battle Angel Alita

See also

 
 Dice-K

Japanese masculine given names